Novye Yurkovichi is a rural locality (a selo) in Klimovsky District, Bryansk Oblast, Russia. It is the administrative center of  Yurkovichskoye Rural Settlement. The town was hit by Ukrainian artillery in July 2022 in the ongoing Russian invasion of Ukraine.

References

Rural localities in Klimovsky District